In the United States, Standards and Practices (also referred to as Broadcast Standards and Practices or BS&P for short) is the name traditionally given to the department at a television network which is responsible for the moral, ethical, and legal implications of the program that network airs. Standards and Practices also ensures fairness on televised game shows, in which they are the adjunct to the judges at the production company level. They also have the power to reprimand and to recommend the termination of television network stars and employees for violations of standards and practices.

Examples of intervention
The Standards and Practices department of NBC censored one of Jack Paar's jokes on the February 10, 1960, episode of The Tonight Show.

Paar was so very taken aback by the network's decision to censor the joke, he walked off the live show the very next day. As he left his desk in the middle of the program, he said, "I am leaving The Tonight Show. There must be a better way of, uh, making a living than this." Paar reappeared on March 7, 1960, strolled on stage, struck a pose, and said, "As I was saying before I was interrupted..." After the audience erupted in applause, Paar continued, "When I walked off, I said there must be a better way of making a living. Well, I've looked...and there isn't." He then went on to explain his departure with typical frankness: "Leaving the show was a childish and perhaps emotional thing. I have been guilty of such action in the past and will perhaps be again. I'm totally unable to hide what I feel. It is not an asset in show business, but I shall do the best I can to amuse and entertain you and let other people speak freely, as I have in the past."

 Episode 97 of Teenage Mutant Ninja Turtles (2003) was unaired in the United States until 2015 due to pressures from Fox Broadcast & Standards (although 4Kids Entertainment leased the time from the network for their FoxBox block and aired the series, it still had to meet Fox's broadcast standards). On the official TMNT website, Lloyd Goldfine states:

The episode finally aired in the United States on August 2, 2015 on Nicktoons following the purchase of the franchise by ViacomCBS (which was later rebranded as Paramount Global).

X-Men: The Animated Series was very heavily influenced by BS&P. Unlike the comic book, characters were rarely ever in any danger and characters almost never hit each other directly.

The CGI series ReBoot was heavily censored by ABC during its two-season run on the network. The network announced the show would be cancelled after its second season after it was purchased by The Walt Disney Company, which would make way for a schedule of all Disney-produced series. The writers wrote scripts for episodes that mocked ABC's S&P department due to it being cancelled, including the insertion of unnoticed profanity within a stream of binary numbers. ReBoot went on to produce another successful season and two made-for-TV movies on other networks which had less strict S&P departments and content standards.

Cartoon Network and its Adult Swim programming block has had various instances of publicly disclosed Standards and Practices encounters:

 The final three episodes of the first season of Moral Orel were held back for various amounts of time by Standards and Practices due to being too dark and over the top sexually crude even for Adult Swim, which airs many shows rated TV-MA. Another episode entitled "God's Chef" was delayed for months before the Adult Swim network was able to show it. It has since been released uncensored, along with the rest of Season 1 and part of Season 2, on DVD.
 Adult Swim programming director Kim Manning revealed in the network's now-defunct online message boards that Adult Swim inquired into airing Elfen Lied in April 2006, but was rejected by its Standards and Practices department because the series contained graphic violence and nudity. The only way the department would approve its airing was to have it extensively edited, so the network ultimately decided not to broadcast at the expense of altering the original work at such a level. Manning stated in the same post that this was also the case with Gantz.

In 2014, according to Rebecca Sugar, the creator of Steven Universe, Cartoon Network Standards and Practices Department informed her that Ruby and Sapphire, who fused together as Garnet, couldn't "kiss on the mouth." Even though, after March 2015, following the release of "Jail Break", fans picked up on the relationship between Ruby and Sapphire, and Pearl's love for Rose Quartz, the show's crew were prohibited from confirming these relationships. Sugar noted that, when she pitched the episode that would become "Reunited" in 2015, she was told that the International Standards and Practices Department of Cartoon Network might object to language about Garnet, and she pushed back more after Ian Jones-Quartey proposed to her. Sugar also noted that a signing card she would give out at the San Diego Comic Con in 2015 was deemed "too romantic," because some at Cartoon Network might become "upset" with the direction of the show. She also noted that after the publication of "The Answer" in September 2016, a children's book adaptation of the episode, "The Answer", she was brought into a meeting and "asked to explain herself," noting that she would, in meetings like this, defend the show's stories and "audience of queer youth."

In June 2021, Abbey White of Insider argued that one of the reasons that kids animation were stymied in their attempts to be more inclusive for decades was due to Standards and Practices departments within networks, the latter which interpreted rating guidelines and definitions of profanity, indecency, and obscenity by the FCC, to guide their notes to crew working on various animated series. One former Cartoon Network executive quoted in the story, Katie Krentz, told the publication that these departments have "wide-ranging content guidelines" on hand, which regulate just about everything, "from characters' technology use to their diet." White noted that these departments, as do studio executives, determine whether words such as "pride" or "gay," or other LGBTQ terms, can be shown on onscreen or said by a character. According to White, this included an unnamed Cartoon Network series in the mid-2010s where writers had to refer to a character's same-gender parents singularly as "Mom" rather than "Moms." Even so, the story said that while these departments have a huge sway, the conservative pushback to certain shows have led to removal of content, and said that top executives have the power to make changes to increase inclusion. Although streaming companies do not have such departments, Krentz argued that, as a result, decisions about LGBTQ representation in a show falls on the "belief system and background" of a single person, putting pressure on creative executives.

Game show incidents

Resulting from the 1950s quiz show scandals, game shows have been closely monitored by network standards and practices departments for possible irregularities. Subsequent to the quiz show scandals, a detailed document is prepared for each show by the show's producers, which sets forth the exact rules of the game. This document is referred to as the "bible". The bible is then used as the definitive authority regarding game play. The contestant release form, which is executed by all contestants, contains language to the effect that decisions of the producer shall be final.

When an irregularity occurs, the most common remedy is to permit the contestant to appear and play the game again at a later date.

The Price Is Right
On rare occasions, contestants who have lost games because of procedural irregularities have been awarded the prizes. Irregularities have occurred when either the prize descriptions or prices displayed for the item in question have been incorrect, mechanical errors/malfunctions with certain pricing game props, or administrative errors by models or the host (such as a misheard bid, models not doing what the contestant requested). When such an error occurs, the contestant is awarded any prizes in question.  If the error is discovered before the ensuing Showcase Showdown (on hour shows), the host informs the contestant upon returning from commercial or before the Showdown, and the contestant is re-seeded for the Showcase Showdown based on the additional winnings. If the error is discovered after the ensuing Showcase Showdown, either a disclaimer appears or is read by the announcer during the closing credits of the show.

If a contestant is discovered to be ineligible, the ineligible contestant will forfeit all prizes, and likewise a disclaimer appears or a statement is read by the announcer at the end of the show.  If the ineligible contestant is found to have won a One Bid, the contestants on Contestants' Row at the time the ineligible contestant was playing and did not win a One Bid are entitled to return to the show immediately once the infraction is discovered, per game show regulations, as their appearance was compromised by an ineligible contestant, pursuant to all game show regulations. The ten-year rule (in which a contestant that gets called up on stage during the show may return if their last appearance on the show was at least 10 years to the day of airing) imposed in 2007 will not be in effect if a contestant lost a One Bid to an ineligible contestant and did not win a further One Bid during that episode.

One of the contestants on the original September 6, 1972 episode (the third show overall) was the common-law wife of a cameraman, and therefore ineligible to appear on any CBS game show. The episode never aired, but the other winners kept their prizes (a replacement show was taped and aired in its place).

On September 8, 2005, CBS aired a repeat airing of The Price is Right from December 2004 featuring a contestant being offered a prize for a trip to New Orleans. While the trip to New Orleans and other tourism-based cities are common prizes on the show, the repeat aired less than two weeks following the city's destruction by Hurricane Katrina and many viewers finding it tactless for CBS to air the episode; network executives quickly caught the mistake and pulled the episode from West Coast airings before its scheduled start time in those markets. CBS subsequently pulled two episodes that were taped in June and July 2005 that also featured trips to New Orleans (one of which was in the Showcase and both were won by their respective contestants) and aired them several months afterwards while the city was still recovering from Katrina.  Each such episode aired at the end of the season with a statement from either of the state's two senators.  Other contestants on the shows were offered their prizes shortly after the postponement was announced and a DVD was sent to each contestant.

In a playing of Plinko taped July 22, 2008, a prop official forgot to remove a fishing line used in the taping of a previous promotion for the official Ludia video game (which guided the chip into a confined pattern leading into the $10,000 channel) before having it readied for game play. A contestant won $30,000 before the mistake was discovered by Associate Producer Adam Sandler (who is now the show's lead producer;  not to be confused with the actor). The game was repaired by having the line removed, and the contestant started at $0. The contestant was allowed to keep the $30,000 because of the violation of procedure, plus the money won during the actual game; however, the $30,000 did not count towards the contestant's cumulative winnings on the show.

During a September 22, 2008 taping, contestant Terry Kneiss made a perfect Showcase bid. CBS Standards and Practices, host Drew Carey, and producer Kathy Greco became highly suspicious that another party in the studio audience had supplied Kneiss with the bid, which then resulted in a stop down as an investigation took place. Although the contestant was ultimately awarded the prizes, the show air date was moved back from its original schedule. As a result of the incident, the show changed its practice regarding prizes, adding up to 30 new prizes which began appearing each taping week. Carey wrote on his blog before the 2009 season premiere that with so few prizes being offered, "It was possible, if one wanted, to watch the show for a while and memorize the price of almost every prize we offered."  The show wanted to prevent a situation similar to a 1984 Press Your Luck incident where a contestant memorized the light pattern to win where the contestant could find the top dollar space that would not hold a penalty space.

Since 2009, CBS Standards and Practices also requires a disclaimer regarding the business interest of host Drew Carey to be mentioned any time a prize features game tickets featuring the Seattle Sounders FC Major League Soccer club, or a player of Sounders FC makes an appearance to present a prize on the show, or the club and its players is mentioned by the host or contestant.  If a Sounders FC prize package is offered in a One Bid, pricing game or in the Showcase, Carey must mention on-air his ownership stake during the bidding.  On the December 15, 2010 episode, after a contestant wore Sounders FC merchandise and the contestant and host talked about the team, the show ran a disclaimer in the credits stating Carey's ownership interest in Sounders FC.  Disclaimers may also be run if other MLS club kits are worn on-air.

In one instance, the host's mistake was reviewed by the host and a staff member immediately.  During the January 30, 2017 episode, a contestant played Clock Game.  Host Drew Carey made a mistake in giving "higher" and "lower" after the contestant's bids.  Carey admitted to the mistake after the first prize was correctly guessed, reviewing the infraction with a camera operator that led to six additional seconds to be added based on his mistake.  The contestant won the second prize, and the bonus prize, with one second remaining after the adjustment.

In one situation, a theme week with rule changes caused a Standards and Practices violation.  On April 23, 2013, during Big Money Week, a contestant played Grand Game for $100,000 instead of the normal prize of $10,000.  The contestant lost at the third guess, which normally is $100, but was $1,000 for Big Money Week.  When a contestant has three successful guesses, the contestant is asked if they are to risk their $1,000 for $10,000, but if they are wrong, they lose everything.  If a contestant has one or two successful guesses, the wrong answer denotes the contestant retains what they had won in the game.  The board operator flipped the game board to show loss at $1,000, where the game board displays 0 (Gas Money displays "0000" when a contestant loses the game;  Grand Game displays 0 only if the contestant gambles and misses on the fourth guess).  At the ensuing Showcase Showdown, host Drew Carey informed the contestant the official committed a Standards and Practices violation, and the contestant won $1,000, as was prescribed in the rules for two correct guesses but missing on the third (since the game started at $10 instead of $1 for this playing).

Other game shows
Contestants on other game shows, such as Jeopardy! and Who Wants to Be a Millionaire?, have been brought back on later episodes after a judging error or an error related to question material had been discovered. Other contestants have had prize money awarded despite not seeing their episodes air due to circumstances beyond theirs or the show's control.

Press Your Luck

In an episode of Press Your Luck, the three players were asked a question regarding which cartoon character used the phrase "Sufferin' Succotash!" After the first contestant buzzed in with the answer "Sylvester", host Peter Tomarken gave two other choices of Goofy and Daffy Duck.  The other two contestants all went with Sylvester, but Tomarken said the correct answer was Daffy Duck. In actuality, both Sylvester and Daffy Duck have said the phrase. During post-production of the episode the error was discovered and a taped segment, in which Tomarken got a "phone call" from Looney Tunes voice actor Mel Blanc (in the voice of Sylvester), explained the mistake and that all three contestants would be invited back on future episodes.

Jeopardy!

 In 1999, a Jeopardy! contestant who lost on a Jeopardy! Teen Tournament game on a questionable ruling during Final Jeopardy! was ordered to be brought back for the 2000 College Championship.
 The September 11 through September 14, 2001 episodes of Jeopardy! aired only on a few stations in the United States due to continuous breaking news coverage of the September 11 attacks wholesale pre-empting the show throughout the United States and Canada outside of a few non-news carrying independent stations airing it. As Jeopardy! has rules where the funds for the cash prizes won by contestants on the series are only issued a set period after the episode has aired (and where the show's confidentiality agreement regarding the results of a game has not been breached), the program's Standards and Practices had to issue a one-time exception for those contestants (along with others who had won cash and prizes on sister series Wheel of Fortune on the same airdates [which also has the same policy regarding the timing of the awarding of cash and prizes]) due to the extraordinary circumstance where the results were unseen until cycled into the show's weekend rerun feed or aired on Game Show Network years later, while the Wheel of Fortune episodes were aired early on Sunday, September 16, 2001 on WJLA-TV in Washington, D.C. after midnight (aside from this, they have not been shown anywhere in reruns since); these episodes are available at archive.org.
 A January 30, 2008 episode of Jeopardy! resulted in Arianna Kelly being brought back on an episode on July 8, 2008 when officials found questionable calls during game play against her during that episode.
 On occasion, an answer will have a different correct question when the show was recorded compared to the time the show airs.  When that happens, the date of taping will appear on screen as the answer is read in order to comply with Standards and Practices.  An example of this was during the second 2014 Jeopardy! Teen Tournament first round match: the answer in the $400 My Present Government Job category in the Jeopardy! round was, "Kathleen Sebelius, Insuring America, one person at a time."  The correct response was "What is the Secretary of Health and Human Services?" However, she had resigned from that position in April 2014, between the taping of the match in March 2014 and the July 22, 2014 broadcast.  The show posted a disclaimer, "Recorded in March 2014," as the category was being read.

Who Wants to Be a Millionaire?

In 2001, Who Wants to Be a Millionaire? contestant Ed Toutant was given the following question:

Toutant selected Tomato, but the show said it was Potato. It was later found the answer was flawed after further research from Marc Knight, a professor at Oxford University Department of Plant Sciences.  The glowing potato was, in fact, developed in Scotland; however, Knight had developed a glowing tomato in England.  Therefore, Toutant's answer of tomato was correct.  The $860,000 Skins Game jackpot was in use at the time, and he was allowed to play for the million and the skins game jackpot, which he eventually won.

Patrick Hugh won $1,000 during a Season 7 (syndicated) episode, but a critical word in his $25,000 question was found to be misspelled. He was given the option of being awarded $25,000 "no questions asked" or to forfeit his winnings and return to the show and begin his game with a new $25,000 question with all four of his lifelines reinstated. Hugh chose the latter option, used two lifelines (Ask the Audience/Double-Dip) to correctly answer his new $25,000 question, and missed the $50,000 question after using his Phone-a-Friend and Ask-the-Expert lifelines, so he left with $25,000 this time.

Million Dollar Money Drop

On December 20, 2010, Million Dollar Money Drop contestants Gabe Okoye and Brittany Mayi lost $800,000 on a bad question:
 Which of these was sold in stores first?
 Macintosh Computer
 Sony Walkman
 Post-it notes

They decided to risk $800,000 on the Post-it notes. According to the show, the Post-it notes were first sold in 1980 and the Walkman was first sold in 1979. The answer was flawed after Internet research indicated that the Post-its were first tested for sale in four cities in 1977 before their nationwide introduction in 1980. In a statement by executive producer Jeff Apploff, the information obtained by the show's research department was incomplete. Due to this research error, Gabe and Brittany were originally going to be invited back for a second chance to play the game, even though their question was not the deciding question in their game. The show was canceled before that could happen. A similar situation happened on the UK version in October 2010 on a Doctor Who question.

In other countries
 In the Philippines, the term network ombudsman (also referred to as office of the network ombudsman) is used for this department.

References

Citations

Bibliography
 Keith Adler. Advertising Resource Handbook. East Lansing, Mich.: Advertising Resources, Inc., 1989.
 Erik Barnouw. A Tower in Babel: A History of Broadcasting, vol. 1. NY: Oxford University Press, 1970.
 Broadcast Self-Regulation, 2nd edn. Washington, D.C.: NAB Code Authority, 1977.
 CBS/Broadcast Group. “Program Standards for the CBS Television Network”, in Television as a Social Issue: The Eighth Applied Social Psychology Annual, ed. Stuart Oskamp. Newbury Park, Cal.: Sage Publications, 1988.
 George Dessart. “Of Tastes and Times: Some Challenging Reflections on Television's Elastic Standards and Astounding Practices”, Television Quarterly (New York), 1992.
 George Dessart. “Standards and Practices”, in Encyclopedia of Television, 2nd edn. Ed. by Horace Newcomb. NY–London: Routledge, 2013, pp. 2186–8 (1st edn. Fitzroy Dearborn, 1997).
 Alice M. Henderson & Helaine Doktori. “How the Networks Monitor Program Content”, in Television as a Social Issue: The Eighth Applied Social Psychology Annual, ed. Stuart Oskamp. Newbury Park, Cal.: Sage Publications, 1988.
 
 Sensitive Theme Programming and the New American Mainstream. New York: Social Research Unit, Marketing & Research Services, ABC, n.d.

External links
 Standards and Practices, The Museum of Broadcast Communications
 Are Fox and The NFL Kidding? Apparently Standards and Practices Are... Fluid.

Censorship of broadcasting in the United States
Television terminology